Toba Waterfall and Arsen Okrojanashvili Cave Natural Monument is the highest in Georgia cascading waterfall of 234 m height and a karst cave complex located 5.6 km to the west from village First Balda (Pirveli Baldi)  in Martvili Municipality, Samegrelo-Zemo Svaneti region of Georgia. 

Morphology 
The Natural Monument Complex is a combination of the Toba Cascading Waterfall and Arsen Okrojanashvili Cave also known as  Toba II Cave. The cave formed in limestones can be accessed using small inflatable boat and is difficult to access by foot. The total length of the cave is 1300 m.
The entrance measured 15 meters in height by 20 meters in width opens along the canyon path. Cave has several levels and numerous pathways. Several prominent halls in the cave are named: "Nona Hall", "Nana Hall", "Salon", "University 50", "Tbian" and so on.  Cave speleothems formed in a variety of shapes. One of the prominent stalagmites reaches 7 meters in height. Water flow in the cave forms four lakes underground and finally, coming out of the cave, produces cascading Toba Waterfall of 234 m height.

See also
Oniore Waterfall and Toba First Cave Natural Monuments

References

Natural monuments of Georgia (country)
Protected areas established in 2013
Waterfalls of Georgia (country)
Geography of Samegrelo-Zemo Svaneti
Caves of Georgia (country)